Gap junctions are specialized intercellular connections between a multitude of animal cell-types. They directly connect the cytoplasm of two cells, which allows various molecules, ions and electrical impulses to directly pass through a regulated gate between cells.

One gap junction channel is composed of two protein hexamers (or hemichannels) called connexons in vertebrates and innexons in invertebrates. The hemichannel pair connect across the intercellular space bridging the gap between two cells. Gap junctions are analogous to the plasmodesmata that join plant cells.

Gap junctions occur in virtually all tissues of the body, with the exception of adult fully developed skeletal muscle and mobile cell types such as sperm or erythrocytes. Gap junctions are not found in simpler organisms such as sponges and slime molds.

A gap junction may also be called a nexus or macula communicans. There has been some confusion with gap junctions being related to ephapses in the past. While an ephapse like a gap junction involves the transmission of electrical signals the two are different. Ephaptic coupling involves electrical signals external to the cells. Ephapses are often studied in the context of electrically induced potentials propogated amoung groups of nerve cell membranes even in the absence of gap junction communication with no discrete subcellular structures known. Unlike gap junctions no specific structure related to an ephapse has yet been described so the process of "ephaptic coupling" is often referred to rather than an ephapse.

Structure
In vertebrates, gap junction hemichannels are primarily homo- or hetero-hexamers of connexin proteins. Invertebrate gap junctions comprise proteins from the innexin family. Innexins have no significant sequence homology with connexins. Though differing in sequence to connexins, innexins are similar enough to connexins to state that innexins form gap junctions in vivo in the same way connexins do. The more recently characterized pannexin family, which was originally thought to form inter-cellular channels (with an amino acid sequence similar to innexins), in fact functions as a single-membrane channel that communicates with the extracellular environment, and has been shown to pass calcium and ATP. This has led to the idea that pannexins may never form intercellular junctions in the same way connexins and innexins do and so should not use the same hemi-channel/channel naming. Others have presented evidence based on genetic sequencing and overall functioning in tissues that pannexins should still be considered part of the gap junction family of proteins despite structural differences in the way function is achieved. They also consider that there are still more groups of connexin orthologs to be discovered.

At gap junctions, the intercellular space is between 2 and 4 nm and hemichannels in the membrane of each cell are aligned with one another.

Gap junction channels formed from two identical hemichannels are called homotypic, while those with differing hemichannels are heterotypic. In turn, hemichannels of uniform protein composition are called homomeric, while those with differing proteins are heteromeric. Channel composition influences the function of gap junction channels and different connexins will not necessarily form heterotypic with all others.

Before innexins and connexins were well characterized, the genes coding for connexin gap junction channels were classified in one of three groups, based on gene mapping and sequence similarity: A, B and C (for example). However, connexin genes do not code directly for the expression of gap junction channels; genes can produce only the proteins that make up gap junction channels. An alternative naming system based on this protein's molecular weight is the most widely used (for example: connexin43=GJA1, connexin30.3=GJB4).

Levels of organization
 The hemichannel genes (DNA) are transcribed to RNA, which is then translated to produce the hemichannel proteins.
 One hemichannel protein has four transmembrane domains
 Six hemichannel proteins create one hemichannel. When different hemichannel proteins join to form one hemichannel, it is called a heteromeric hemichannel.
 Two hemichannels, joined across a cell membrane comprise a Gap Junction channel.When two identical hemichannel proteins come together to form a Gap junction channel, it is called a homotypic GJ channel. When one homomeric hemichannel and one heteromeric hemichannel come together, it is called a heterotypic gap junction channel. When two heteromeric hemichannels join, it is also called a heterotypic Gap Junction channel.
 Gap junction channels (tens to thousands) assemble within a macromolecular complex called a gap junction plaque.

Properties of hemichannel pairs

A hemichannel channel pair:
 Allows for direct electrical communication between cells, although different hemichannel subunits can impart different single channel conductances, from about 30 pS to 500 pS.
 Allows for chemical communication between cells, through the transmission of small second messengers, such as inositol triphosphate and calcium, although different hemichannel subunits can impart different selectivity for particular small molecules.
 In general, allows transmembrane movement of molecules smaller than 485 Daltons (1,100 Daltons through invertebrate gap junctions), although different hemichannel subunits may impart different pore sizes and different charge selectivity. Large biomolecules, for example, nucleic acid and protein, are precluded from cytoplasmic transfer between cells through gap junction hemichannel pairs.
 Ensures that molecules and current passing through the gap junction do not leak into the intercellular space.

To date, five different functions have been ascribed to gap junction protein:
 Electrical and metabolic coupling between cells
 Electrical and metabolic exchange through hemichannels
 Tumor suppressor genes (Cx43, Cx32 and Cx36)
 Adhesive function independent of conductive gap junction channel (neural migration in neocortex)
 Role of carboxyl-terminal in signaling cytoplasmic pathways (Cx43)

Occurrence and distribution
Gap Junctions have been observed in various animal organs and tissues where cells contact each other. From the 1950s to 1970s they were detected in crayfish nerves, rat pancreas, liver, adrenal cortex, epididymis, duodenum, muscle, Daphnia hepatic caecum, Hydra muscle, monkey retina, rabbit cornea, fish blastoderm, frog embryos, rabbit ovary, re-aggregating cells, cockroach hemocyte capsules, rabbit skin, chick embryos, human islet of Langerhans, goldfish and hamster pressure sensing acoustico-vestibular receptors, lamprey and tunicate heart, rat seminiferous tubules, myometrium, eye lens and cephalopod digestive epithelium. Since the 1970s gap junctions have continued to be found in nearly all animal cells that touch each other. By the 1990s new technology such as confocal microscopy allowed more rapid survey of large areas of tissue. Since the 1970s even tissues that were traditionally considered to possibly have isolated cells such as bone showed that the cells were still connected with gap junctions, however tenuously. Gap junctions appear to be in all animal organs and tissues and it will be interesting to find exceptions to this other than cells not normally in contact with neighboring cells. Adult skeletal muscle is a possible exception. It may be argued that if present in skeletal muscle, gap junctions might propagate contractions in an arbitrary way among cells making up the muscle. At least in some cases this may not be the case as shown in other muscle types that do have gap junctions. An indication of what results from reduction or absence of gap junctions may be found by analysis of cancers or the aging process.

Since the discovery of innexins, pannexins and unnexins, gaps in our knowledge of intercellular communication are becoming more defined. Innexins look and behave similarly to connexins and so can be seen to fill a similar role to connexins in invertebrates. Pannexins also look individually similar to connexins but unlike connexins do not appear to easily form gap junctions. Connexins have been found in only vertebrata and tunicata of over 20 different major metazoan groups. Innexins and pannexins are far more widespread including innexin homologues in vertebrates. Even the unicellular Trypanosomatidae parasites have unnexin genes presumably to aid in their infection of animals including humans. As we learn more the term "Gap Junction" appears to be the accurate description of a intercellular structure it was originally coined for more than a well defined type of intercellular communication. Interestingly gap junction like structures are found in sponges despite not having pannexins. While we are still at the early stages of understanding the nervous system of a sponge the "gap junctions" of sponges may as yet indicate intercellular communications pathways.

Functions
Gap junctions may be seen to function at the simplest level as a direct cell to cell pathway for electrical currents, small molecules and ions. The control of this communication allows complex downstream effects on multicellular organisms as described below.

Embryonic, organ and tissue development
In the 1980s, more subtle but no less important roles of gap junction communication have been investigated. It was discovered that gap junction communication could be disrupted by adding anti-connexin antibodies into embryonic cells. Embryos with areas of blocked gap junctions failed to develop normally. The mechanism by which antibodies blocked the gap junctions was unclear but systematic studies were undertaken to elucidate the mechanism. Refinement of these studies showed that gap junctions appeared to be key to development of cell polarity and the left/right symmetry/asymmetry in animals. While signaling that determines the position of body organs appears to rely on gap junctions so does the more fundamental differentiation of cells at later stages of embryonic development.

Gap junctions were also found to be responsible for the transmission of signals required for drugs to have an effect and conversely some drugs were shown to block gap junction channels.

Gap junctions, the "bystander effect" and therapies

Cell death
The "bystander effect" with its connotations of the innocent bystander being killed is also mediated by gap junctions. When cells are compromised due to disease or injury and start to die messages are transmitted to neighboring cells connected to the dying cell by gap junctions. This can cause the otherwise unaffected healthy bystander cells to also die. The bystander effect is, therefore, important to consider in diseased cells, which opened an avenue for more funding and a flourish of research. Later the bystander effect was also researched with regard to cells damaged by radiation or mechanical injury and therefore wound healing. Disease also seems to have an effect on the ability of gap junctions to fulfill their roles in wound healing. The oral administration of gap junction blockers to reduce the symptoms of disease in remote parts of the body is slowly becoming a reality.

Tissue restructuring
While there has been a tendency to focus on the bystander effect in disease due to the possibility of therapeutic avenues there is evidence that there is a more central role in normal development of tissues. Death of some cells and their surrounding matrix may be required for a tissue to reach its final configuration and gap junctions also appear essential to this process. There are also more complex studies that try to combine our understanding of the simultaneous roles of gap junctions in both wound healing and tissue development.

Areas of electrical coupling
Gap junctions electrically and chemically couple cells throughout the body of most animals. Electrical coupling can be relatively fast acting. Tissues in this section have well known functions observed to be coordinated by gap junctions with inter-cellular signaling happening in time frames of micro-seconds or less.

Heart
Gap junctions are particularly important in cardiac muscle: the signal to contract is passed efficiently through gap junctions, allowing the heart muscle cells to contract in unison.

Neurons
A gap junction located in neurons is often referred to as an electrical synapse. The electrical synapse was discovered using electrical measurements before the gap junction structure was described. Electrical synapses are present throughout the central nervous system and have been studied specifically in the neocortex, hippocampus, vestibular nucleus, thalamic reticular nucleus, locus coeruleus, inferior olivary nucleus, mesencephalic nucleus of the trigeminal nerve, ventral tegmental area, olfactory bulb, retina and spinal cord of vertebrates.

There has been some observation of weak neuron to glial cell coupling in the locus coeruleus, and in the cerebellum between Purkinje neurons and Bergmann glial cells. It appears that astrocytes are coupled by gap junctions, both to other astrocytes and to oligodendrocytes. Moreover, mutations in the gap junction genes Cx43 and Cx56.6 cause white matter degeneration similar to that observed in Pelizaeus–Merzbacher disease and multiple sclerosis.

Connexin proteins expressed in neuronal gap junctions include:
 mCX36
 mCX57
 mCX45
with mRNAs for at least five other connexins (mCx26, mCx30.2, mCx32, mCx43, mCx47) detected but without immunocytochemical evidence for the corresponding protein within ultrastructurally-defined gap junctions. Those mRNAs appear to be down-regulated or destroyed by micro interfering RNAs (miRNAs) that are cell-type and cell-lineage specific.

Retina
Neurons within the retina show extensive coupling, both within populations of one cell type, and between different cell types.

Discovery

Naming
Gap junctions were so named because of the "gap" shown to be present at these special junctions between two cells. With the increased resolution of the transmission electron microscope (TEM) gap junction structures were first able to be seen and described in around 1952.

The term "gap junction" appeared to be coined about 16 years later circa 1969. A similar narrow regular gap was not demonstrated in other intercellular junctions photographed using the TEM at the time.

Form an indicator of function
Well before the demonstration of the "gap" in gap junctions they were seen at the junction of neighboring nerve cells. The close proximity of the neighboring cell membranes at the gap junction lead researchers to speculate that they had a role in intercellular communication, in particular the transmission of electrical signals. Gap junctions were also proven to be electrically rectifying and referred to as an electrical synapse. Later it was found that chemicals could also be transported between cells through gap junctions.

Implicit or explicit in most of the early studies is that the area of the gap junction was different in structure to the surrounding membranes in a way that made it look different. The gap junction had been shown to create a micro-environment between the two cells in the extra-cellular space or "gap". This portion of extra-cellular space was somewhat isolated from the surrounding space and also bridged by what we now call connexon pairs which form even more tightly sealed bridges that cross the gap junction gap between two cells. When viewed in the plane of the membrane by freeze-fracture techniques, higher-resolution distribution of connexons within the gap junction plaque is possible.

Connexin free islands are observed in some junctions. The observation was largely without explanation until vesicles were shown by Peracchia using TEM thin sections to be systematically associated with gap junction plaques. Peracchia's study was probably also the first study to describe paired connexon structures, which he called somewhat simply a "globule". Studies showing vesicles associated with gap junctions and proposing the vesicle contents may move across the junction plaques between two cells were rare, as most studies focused on the connexons rather than vesicles. A later study using a combination of microscopy techniques confirmed the early evidence of a probable function for gap junctions in intercellular vesicle transfer. Areas of vesicle transfer were associated with connexin free islands within gap junction plaques. Connexin 43 has been shown to be necessary for the transfer of whole mitochondria to neighboring cells though whether the mitochondria is transferred directly through the membrane or within a vesicle is not determined

Electrical and chemical nerve synapses
Because of the widespread occurrence of gap junctions in cell types other than nerve cells the term gap junction became more generally used than terms such as electrical synapse or nexus. Another dimension in the relationship between nerve cells and gap junctions was revealed by studying chemical synapse formation and gap junction presence. By tracing nerve development in leeches with gap junction expression suppressed it was shown that the bidirectional gap junction (electrical nerve synapse) needs to form between two cells before they can grow to form a unidirectional "chemical nerve synapse". The chemical nerve synapse is the synapse most often truncated to the more ambiguous term "nerve synapse".

Composition

Connexins
The purification of the intercellular gap junction plaques enriched in the channel forming protein (connexin) showed a protein forming hexagonal arrays in x-ray diffraction. Now the systematic study and identification of the predominant gap junction protein became possible. 
Refined ultrastructural studies by TEM showed protein occurred in a complementary fashion in both cells participating in a gap junction plaque. The gap junction plaque is a relatively large area of membrane observed in TEM thin section and freeze fracture (FF) seen filled with trans-membrane proteins in both tissues and more gently treated gap junction preparations. With the apparent ability for one protein alone to enable intercellular communication seen in gap junctions the term gap junction tended to become synonymous with a group of assembled connexins though this was not shown in vivo. Biochemical analysis of gap junction rich isolates from various tissues demonstrated a family of connexins.

Ultrastructure and biochemistry of isolated gap junctions already referenced had indicated the connexins preferentially group in gap junction plaques or domains and connexins were the best characterized constituent. It has been noted that the organisation of proteins into arrays with a gap junction plaque may be significant. It is likely this early work was already reflecting the presence of more than just connexins in gap junctions. Combining the emerging fields of freeze-fracture to see inside membranes and immunocytochemistry to label cell components (Freeze-fracture replica immunolabelling or FRIL and thin section immunolabelling) showed gap junction plaques in vivo contained the connexin protein. Later studies using immunofluorescence microscopy of larger areas of tissue clarified diversity in earlier results. Gap junction plaques were confirmed to have variable composition being home to connexon and non-connexin proteins as well making the modern usage of the terms "gap junction" and "gap junction plaque" non-interchangeable. In other words, the commonly used term "gap junction" always refers to a structure that contains connexins while a gap junction plaque may also contain other structural features that will define it.

The "plaque" or "formation plaque"

Early descriptions of "gap junctions", "connexons" or "innexons", did not refer to them as such and many other terms were used. It is likely that "synaptic disks" were an accurate reference to gap junction plaques. While the detailed structure and function of the connexon was described in a limited way at the time the gross "disk" structure was relatively large and easily seen by various TEM techniques. Disks allowed researchers using TEM to easily locate the connexons contained within the disk like patches in vivo and in vitro. The disk or "plaque" appeared to have structural properties different from those imparted by the connexons/innexons alone. It was thought that if the area of membrane in the plaque transmitted signals the area of membrane would have to be sealed in some way to prevent leakage.
Later studies showed gap junction plaques are home to non-connexin proteins making the modern usage of the terms "gap junction" and "gap junction plaque" non-interchangeable as the area of the gap junction plaque may contain proteins other than connexins. Just as connexins do not always occupy the entire area of the plaque the other components described in the literature may be only long term or short-term residents.

Studies allowing views inside the plane of the membrane of gap junctions during formation indicated that a "formation plaque" formed between two cells prior to the connexins moving in. They were particle free areas when observed by TEM FF indicating very small or no transmembrane proteins were likely present. Little is known about what structures make up the formation plaque or how the formation plaque's structure changes when connexins and other components move in or out. One of the earlier studies of the formation of small gap junctions describes rows of particles and particle free halos. With larger gap junctions they were described as formation plaques with connexins moving into them. The particulate gap junctions were thought to form 4–6 hours after the formation plaques appeared. How the connexins may be transported to the plaques using tubulin is becoming clearer.

The formation plaque and non-connexin part of the classical gap junction plaque have been difficult for early researchers to analyse. It appears in TEM FF and thin section to be a lipid membrane domain that can somehow form a comparatively rigid barrier to other lipids and proteins. There has been indirect evidence for certain lipids being preferentially involved with the formation plaque but this cannot be considered definitive. It is difficult to envisage breaking up the membrane to analyse membrane plaques without affecting their composition. By study of connexins still in membranes lipids associated with the connexins have been studied. It was found that specific connexins tended to associate preferentially with specific phospholipids. As formation plaques precede connexins these results still give no certainty as to what is unique about the composition of plaques themselves. Other findings show connexins associate with protein scaffolds used in another junction, the zonula occludens ZO1. While this helps us understand how connexins may be moved into a gap junction formation plaque the composition of the plaque itself is still somewhat sketchy. Some headway on the in vivo composition of the gap junction plaque is being made using TEM FRIL.

See also
 Gap junction modulation
 Gap junction protein
 Innexin
 Vinnexin
 Intercalated disc
 Ion channel
 Junctional complex
 Tight junction

References

Further reading

External links

 

Cell communication
Cell signaling
Cell anatomy
Articles containing video clips